Kathleen Ross, SNJM, is founding president of Heritage University, which opened in 1982.

A member of the religious order of the Sisters of the Holy Names of Jesus and Mary, she graduated from Fort Wright College with a B.A., from Georgetown University with a M.A., and from the Claremont Graduate School with a Ph.D., where she studied with Peter Drucker and Howard Bowen. In 1997 she was a MacArthur Fellow. She is the 2011 CGU Distinguished Alumni Award Recipient. She currently serves on the Board of Trustees of Holy Names University in Oakland, CA.

Awards
 2010 Henry Paley Memorial Award 
 1995 Washington State Medal of Merit award
 1997 MacArthur Fellows Program
 1989 Harold McGraw Prize in education
 1991 John Caroll Award, by Georgetown University

References

American educators
Georgetown University alumni
Claremont Graduate University alumni
MacArthur Fellows
Living people
Year of birth missing (living people)